Omaha–Ponca is a Siouan language spoken by the Omaha (Umoⁿhoⁿ) people of Nebraska and the Ponca (Paⁿka) people of Oklahoma and Nebraska.  The two dialects differ minimally but are considered distinct languages by their speakers.

Use and revitalization efforts 
There are today only 60 speakers of Omaha, and 12 fluent speakers, all over 70; and a handful of semi-fluent speakers of Ponca.

The University of Nebraska offers classes in the Omaha language, and its Omaha Language Curriculum Development Project (OLCDP) provides Internet-based materials for learning the language. A February 2015 article gives the number of fluent speakers as 12, all over age 70, which includes two qualified teachers; the Tribal Council estimates about 150 people have some ability in the language. The language is taught at the Umónhon Nation Public School. An Omaha Basic iPhone app has been developed by the Omaha Nation Public Schools (UNPS) and the Omaha Language Cultural Center (ULCC). Members of the Osage Nation of Oklahoma have expressed an interest in partnerships to use the language as a basis of revitalizing the Osage language, which is similar. Louis Headman edited a dictionary of the Ponca People, published by the University of Nebraska Press.

Phonology

Consonants

One consonant, sometimes written l or th, is a velarized lateral approximant with interdental release, found for example in ní btháska  "flat water" (Platte River), the source of the name Nebraska.

Consonants are written as in the IPA in school programs, apart from the alveopalatals j, ch, chʰ, zh, sh, shʼ, the glottal stop ’, the voiced velar fricative gh, and the dental approximant th. Historically, this th has also been written dh, ð, ¢, and the sh and x as c and q; the tenuis stops p t ch k have either been written upside-down or double (pp, kk, etc.). These latter unusual conventions serve to distinguish these sounds from the p t ch k of other Siouan languages, which are not specified for voicing and so may sound like either Omaha–Ponca p t ch k or b d j g. The letters f, l, q, r, v are not used in writing Omaha-Ponca.

Vowels 

The letter ‘o’ is phonemically /au/, and phonetically [əw].

There are two or three nasal vowels, depending on the variety. The close front nasal vowel  remains distinct.

Nasalized vowels are fairly new to the Ponca language.  Assimilation has taken place leftward, as opposed to right to left, from nasalized consonants over time. "Originally when the vowel was oral, it nasalized the consonant and a nasalized vowel never followed suit, instead, the nasalized vowel came to preceded it"; though this is not true for the Omaha, or its 'mother' language."

Omaha/Ponca is a tonal language that utilizes  downstep (accent) or a lowering process that applies to the second of two high-tone syllables.  A downstepped high tone would be slightly lower than the preceding high tone.”: wathátʰe  "food", wáthatʰe  "table". Vowel length is distinctive in accented syllables, though it is often not written:  "heart",  "(inside) wall".

Omaha-Ponca is a daughter language to the Siouan mother language, but has developed some of its own rules for nasalization and aspiration. What were once allophones in Proto-Siouan have become phonemes in the Omaha–Ponca language.

Many contrasts in the Omaha/Ponca language are unfamiliar to speakers of English. Below are examples of minimal pairs for some sounds which in English would be considered allophones, but in Omaha/Ponca constitute different phonemes:

 

In many languages nasalization of vowels would be a part of assimilation to the next consonant, but Omaha/Ponca is different because it is always assimilating. For example: iⁿdáthiⁿga, meaning mysterious, moves from a nasalized /i/ to an alveolar, stop. Same thing happens with the word iⁿshte, meaning, for example, has the nasalized /i/ which does not assimilate to another nasal. It changes completely to an alveolar fricative.

Morphology
Omaha Ponca language adds endings to its definite articles to indicate animacy, number, position and number.
Ponca definite articles indicate animacy, position and number

Syntax
Omaha-Ponca's syntactic type is subject-object-verb.

Notes

References
 Boas, Franz. "Notes on the Ponka grammar", Congrès international des américanistes, Proceedings 2:217-37. 
 Dorsey, James Owen. Omaha and Ponka Letters. Washington: Government Printing Office, 1891
 Dorsey, James Owen. The Cegiha Language. Washington: Government Printing Office. 1890
 Dorsey, Rev. J. Owen Omaha Sociology. Washington: Smithsonian, Bureau of American Ethnology, Report No. 3, 1892–1893
 List of basic references on Omaha-Ponca

External links 

 Omaha-Ponca Indian Language (Cegiha, Dhegiha), native-language.org
 . Extensive language learning materials, including audio.
Omaha Ponca dictionary
 Omaha Ponca grammar
 OLAC resources in and about the Omaha-Ponca language
 Chairman Elmer Blackbird Delivers Introduction (in Omaha-Ponca) .mp3
 Ponca Hymns sung by the congregation of White Eagle United Methodist Church

Omaha (Native American) people
Ponca
Subject–object–verb languages
Indigenous languages of Oklahoma
Western Siouan languages